Malagasanja is a monotypic moth genus in the family Eupterotidae erected by Thierry Bouyer in 2011. Its single species, Malagasanja palliatella, was described by Pierre Viette in 1954. It is found in Madagascar.

References

Moths described in 1954
Janinae
Monotypic moth genera